Quanita Bobbs (born 3 September 1993) is a South African field hockey player for the South African national team.

She participated at the 2018 Women's Hockey World Cup.
She lost the opening match against Germany 3-1 but 
She was going to play at the Tokyo Olympics, but the event got postponed due to COVID-19. However, she still participated in 2021, when the Olympics took place.

References

External links

South African female field hockey players
Female field hockey midfielders
Field hockey players at the 2018 Commonwealth Games
1993 births
Living people
Commonwealth Games competitors for South Africa
Field hockey players at the 2020 Summer Olympics
Olympic field hockey players of South Africa
Field hockey players at the 2010 Summer Youth Olympics
21st-century South African women
Field hockey players from Cape Town
Field hockey players at the 2022 Commonwealth Games